Tea green leafhopper (or leaf-hopper) may refer to:

 Empoasca vitis, also known as the false-eye leafhopper
 Jacobiasca formosana, also known as the tea jassid, distributed throughout East, South, and Southeast Asia